Dimitra Pavlou (born 21 April 2004) is a Greek tennis player.

Pavlou has a career-high singles ranking of world No. 1268, achieved on 13 December 2021. She also has a career-high doubles ranking by the WTA of 1073, reached on 6 December 2021. So far, she has won one doubles title on the ITF Circuit.

Pavlou also has represented Greece in the Fed Cup with a win/loss record of 0–2.

ITF Circuit finals

Singles: 1 runner-up

Doubles: 7 (5 titles, 2 runner-ups)

References

External links
 
 
 

2004 births
Living people
Greek female tennis players
Sportspeople from Athens